Dynaxibility  is an artificial word in the systemic view on methods, which also contains influences from Change Management and Chaostheory. The word is a compound of Dynamics, Complexity Ability. It describes a method for dealing with  change processes in organizations and their environment.

Dynaxity 
In principle, Dynaxibility is about the ability to deal with Dynaxity.

References 

Business process management
Systems theory